Dickson is a suburb in the Inner North of Canberra, Australia. It is named after Sir James R. Dickson (1832–1901) who was a Queensland advocate of Australian Federation and one of the founders of the Australian Constitution. There is no specific theme for street names.

History
Between March 1924 and November 1926, the original Canberra Aerodrome occupied the southern third of Edward Shumack's soldier settlement block (which continued to be used for sheep grazing) in what was then known as the District of Ainslie (Block 98i). The official aerodrome extended from a NW corner north of Dickson Library near Antill St in Downer to a SE corner near Dutton St and Majura Avenue, taking in the whole western portion of Majura playing fields and the entire central residential portion of Dickson between Cowper St and Dickson wetlands.  The actual landing ground covered the whole of Section 72 Dickson and was marked by placements of rocks at four corners, a windsock, and a large central whitewashed marker (60 feet in diameter) visible to pilots from a distance. This was Canberra's original airport, and was used by RAAF and civilian flights.

Canberra's first air crash took place here, at about 10.30am on 11 February 1926, when a RAAF De Havilland DH9 traveling from Richmond air base to survey the Murrumbidgee River stalled after making a sharp turn to land and crashed in the NW corner, within 100m of where the library now stands, bursting into flames. The 26 year old pilot, Philip Mackenzie Pitt, was killed on impact and is buried in an unmarked grave at Queanbeyan's Riverside cemetery, in the Catholic section. Pitt had trained as a cadet at Duntroon, and done his flight training at Point Cook near Melbourne in 1925. The 25 year old aerial photographer/observer in the back seat, William Edward Callander, was pulled from the wreckage by a farm worker, Walter Ernest Johnson, who had been ploughing the adjoining paddock and leapt the fence to offer aid to the victims. Callander died at Acton Hospital later that evening and is buried at St John's Church in Reid, leaving a widow and two small children. The aerodrome was surveyed six months later by the Federal Capital Commission (FCC), but unwillingness by the FCC to grant a long-term lease to the Department of Defence stymied investment in a hangar and other facilities, and urgency to prepare for the opening of provisional Parliament House in 1927 resulted in the aerodrome being transferred to the Duntroon property in Majura Valley (at the western edge of the current airport site).

Dickson was gazetted on 28 September 1928 and took in the whole of what are now the suburbs of Dickson and Downer. All of the land in Dickson had been earmarked for an Industrial area on the final 1918 Griffin Plan and blueprint. However the decision to transfer the Industrial area to Fyshwick was taken by 1945, and a 25-year lease was granted in 1940 to Dr Bertram Thomas Dickson, Chief of the Plant Industry Division of the CSIR, for Dickson Experiment Station. The station covered 640 acres, comprising the eastern third and northern edge of Dickson, the whole of Downer (which at that time was named Dickson), and a small part of what is now Watson at the station's northern end. Dickson Experiment Station began operating during World War II and initially focused on trialling crops to aid the war effort including opium, rubber and pyrethrum, with assistance from the Women's Land Army. After the war ended, Dickson Experiment Station focused on soils and pasture research, food crops and sheep farming until as late as 1962. By May 1951 the Department of the Interior had determined that the land was required for suburban expansion and begun sketching plans for new road layouts, schools and a district shopping centre. Antill Street and the stormwater drain were built in 1958–59, and the first incursion into the Experiment Station was for a motel on the corner of Northbourne Avenue south of Antill Street (where the Telstra building is now). The Experiment Station's work was transferred to Ginninderra Experiment Station in Belconnen. The first houses in the suburb were built near Braddon in 1958.

Geography
The suburb is bounded by Northbourne Avenue, Antill Street, Phillip Avenue, Majura Avenue, Limestone Avenue and Wakefield Avenue. Dickson contains no hills or significant slopes. The east arm of Sullivans Creek passes through the middle of Dickson draining storm water from east to west.

Amenities

The suburb contains the Dickson Centre, a significant commercial centre in Canberra's Inner North containing the Woolworths Supermarkets outlet with the greatest turnover in Australia. The centre contains an ambulance station, office buildings, many shops and the Dickson Baptist Church.

Outside the Dickson Centre, the suburb contains the Australian Broadcasting Corporation Canberra radio and television studios. Two colleges are located in the suburb, Dickson College, a public senior secondary school, and Daramalan College, a Catholic high school. The Daramalan Junior school was once located in Dickson, which operated between 1986 and 1997. It was a school for boys in years 5 and 6, and was near St. Brigid's Church.

Dickson has large playing fields with several ovals, which are used to play many sports including soccer, cricket and rugby, as well as the venue for schools carnivals, and are a popular place on weekends. Organisations calling the playing fields home including the Majura Junior Soccer Club and Corroboree Little Athletics. Near the playing fields is a walking track between rows of pine, oak and gum trees which leads to the Dickson shopping centre. Hawdon Street is where the Canberra Space Dome and Observatory used to be located before being destroyed by fire in 2010. The street is cut in half by the eastern branch of Sullivans Creek, which runs in a concrete drain. On the south side of Sullivans Creek at this point is the Dickson Wetlands, which was completed in December 2011.

Character 
The suburb is characterised by leafy streets, detached single dwelling houses, and double story duplex town houses. The western part of the suburb is beginning to be redeveloped under a policy permitting two and three-storey flats. Redevelopment with eight to ten-storey flats is permitted on properties near Northbourne Avenue and one such block of flats has been built near the ABC studios.

Demographics
Notably 22.5% worked in central government administration, compared to the Australian average of 1.1%, although the ACT-wide average is a similar 17.1%. Dickson is favoured by students and young adults with 32.4% of its population in the 20 to 34-year-old age group (compared to the Australian average of 20.5%). The suburb has few children under 15: 12.9%, compared to 18.2% Australia-wide. 33.2% of the dwellings are occupied by single person households, compared to the Australian average of 25.6%. 60.1% of the population had no religion, while 12.5% were Catholic, 4.8% not stated, 4.6% Buddhist and 3.8% Anglican .

Politics 

Dickson is located within the federal electorate of Canberra and it is represented by Alicia Payne for the Labor Party. In the ACT Legislative Assembly, Dickson is part of the electorate of Kurrajong, which elects five members on the basis of proportional representation, two Labor, two Greens and one Liberal. Polling place statistics are shown to the right for the Dickson polling place at Daramalan College in the 2022 federal and 2020 ACT elections.

Geology

Calcareous shales from the Canberra Formation dates from the Silurian period. 
This rock is the limestone of the original title of Canberra "Limestone Plains".  Quaternary alluvium lies on top of the shale in the flatter parts of Dickson.

Footnotes

References

Map of Dickson oval

Suburbs of Canberra